Jeremy may refer to:

 Jeremy (given name), a given name
 Jérémy, a French given name
 Jeremy (film), a 1973 film
 "Jeremy" (song), a song by Pearl Jam
 Jeremy (snail), a left-coiled garden snail that died in 2017
 Jeremy, a 1919 novel by Hugh Walpole

See also
 
 
 Jeremiah (disambiguation)
 Jeremie (disambiguation)
 Jerome (disambiguation)
 Jeromy (disambiguation)